Matteo Liviero (born 13 April 1993) is an Italian professional footballer who plays as a left back or as a wide midfielder for  club Torres.

Club career
Born in Castelfranco Veneto, Liviero began his career within the youth sector of Juventus. He began to earn call-ups to the senior squad during the 2010–11 season under then-Juventus manager Luigi Delneri. He made his professional debut for Juventus in the 2010–11 UEFA Europa League, in a match against Austrian team Red Bull Salzburg on 4 November 2010.

After graduating from the Primavera squad in June 2012, Liviero was sent on loan to Perugia in the Lega Pro Prima Divisione in order to gain first-team experience along with fellow Juventus youth-teammate, Carlos García. He spent further loan spells at Carpi, Juve Stabia, Pro Vercelli and Lecce. He also signed a new 2-year contract with Juve in 2014.

On 4 July 2016 Liviero was signed by Juve Stabia. He moved to Cittadella in January 2018. In his very first game for Cittadella he suffered a fibula fracture, missed most of the remainder of the season and his contract was allowed to lapse after the season ended.

On 31 January 2019, he signed with Fano.

On 1 August 2019, he joined Vicenza.

On 28 January 2021 he moved to Monopoli.

On 16 August 2021 he signed a one-year deal with Imolese.

On 11 August 2022, Liviero moved to Torres.

International career
Liviero has been an Italian international since the under-17 level. He was a regular for the under-19 squad during the 2012 European Championship qualification.

References

External links
 
 

1993 births
Living people
People from Castelfranco Veneto
Sportspeople from the Province of Treviso
Footballers from Veneto
Italian footballers
Association football defenders
Association football midfielders
Serie B players
Serie C players
Juventus F.C. players
A.C. Perugia Calcio players
A.C. Carpi players
S.S. Juve Stabia players
F.C. Pro Vercelli 1892 players
U.S. Lecce players
A.S. Cittadella players
Alma Juventus Fano 1906 players
L.R. Vicenza players
S.S. Monopoli 1966 players
Imolese Calcio 1919 players
S.E.F. Torres 1903 players
Italy youth international footballers
Italy under-21 international footballers